Acupalpus brunnicolor is an insect-eating ground beetle of the Acupalpus genus. It is the only Acupalpus species found in Australia, where its range is from Queensland, the Northern Territory, and Western Australia. It is an omnivorous, seed-eating insect with a length of 3-4 mm.

References 

brunnicolor
Beetles described in 1898

Fauna of Queensland
Fauna of Western Australia
Fauna of the Northern Territory